The 2005–06 All-Ireland Senior Club Football Championship was the 36th staging of the All-Ireland Senior Club Football Championship since its establishment by the Gaelic Athletic Association in 1970-71. The championship began on 16 October 2005 and ended on 17 March 2006.

Ballina Stephenites were the defending champions, however, they failed to qualify after being beaten by Charlestown Sarsfields in a quarter-final replay in the 2005 Mayo County Championship.

On 17 March 2006, Salthill-Knocknacarra won the championship following a 0-07 to 0-06 defeat of St. Gall's in the All-Ireland final at Croke Park. It remains their only championship title.

James Masters from the Nemo Rangers club was the championship's top scorer with 2-17.

Results

Connacht Senior Club Football Championship

Quarter-final

Semi-finals

Final

Leinster Senior Club Football Championship

First round

Quarter-finals

Semi-finals

Final

Munster Senior Club Football Championship

Quarter-finals

Semi-finals

Final

Ulster Senior Club Football Championship

Preliminary round

Quarter-finals

Semi-finals

Final

All-Ireland Senior Club Football Championship

Quarter-final

Semi-finals

Final

Championship statistics

Top scorers

Overall

In a single game

References

2005 in Gaelic football
2006 in Gaelic football